The Georgia Pacific Railway was a railway company chartered on December 31, 1881, consolidating the Georgia Western Railroad and the Georgia Pacific Railroad Company of Alabama. 

The Georgia Western Railroad was chartered by the Georgia Legislature in 1854, incorporated by Richard Peters, Lemuel Grant, and other prominent Atlantans. Its mission was to connect Atlanta via Villa Rica or Carrollton with destinations to the southwest in the direction of Alabama, specifically Jacksonville or Tuscaloosa.

After consolidation, construction between 1882 and 1889 allowed the Georgia Pacific to connect Atlanta, Georgia, and Greenville, Mississippi. Regular service to Atlanta began May 15, 1882, and the road to Birmingham, Alabama, was completed in November 1883.

The company was a predecessor of the Southern Railway, which absorbed it after 1894. The Southern Railway eventually was consolidated into the Norfolk Southern Railway.

References

Predecessors of the Southern Railway (U.S.)
Defunct Georgia (U.S. state) railroads
Railway companies established in 1881
Railway companies disestablished in 1894
American companies established in 1881